Pablo Gómez or  Pablo Gomez may refer to:
Pablo Gómez Álvarez (born 1946), Mexican politician
Pablo Gómez (guitarist), Mexican guitarist
Pablo Gómez (footballer), Spanish football player/manager
Pablo Hernán Gómez (1977–2001), Argentine football striker
Pablo S. Gomez (1931–2010), Filipino fantasy writer